Albert Stanley Gordon McDonald (12 March 1890 – 14 June 1952) was an Australian rules footballer who played for the Collingwood Football Club in the Victorian Football League (VFL).

Notes

External links 

		
Bert McDonald's profile at Collingwood Forever

1890 births
1952 deaths
Australian rules footballers from Victoria (Australia)
Collingwood Football Club players